Karsonya "Kaye" Wise Whitehead is an American educator, author, radio host, speaker, and documentary filmmaker who is known as the #blackmommyactivist. She is the founding director of The Karson Institute for Race, Peace, and Social Justice, a Professor of Communication and African and African American Studies at Loyola University Maryland, and the host of Today With Dr. Kaye on WEAA. In 2022, Dr. Kaye received the Vernon Jarrett Medal for Journalistic Excellence from Morgan State University’s School of Global Journalism and Communication (SGJC) for Outstanding Reporting on the Impact Racial Reckoning Has Had in Helping to Close Social/Racial Wealth Gap for Black People in America; was selected by the Daily Record as one of Maryland's Top 100 Women and was highlighted by Black Girls Vote Ladies and Politics Spotlight.  As one of only a handful of Black women who solo host a daily drive-time afternoon radio shows, Dr. Kaye's radio show has received numerous awards, most recently the show won both the 2022 Chesapeake Associated Press Award for Best Talk Show and Best in Show and won Second Place for Best Editorial or Commentary.  

In 2021, Dr. Kaye received the Edward R. Murrow Regional Award in the inaugural category, Excellence in Diversity, Equity, and Inclusion (Region 12); 2021 Chesapeake Associated Press Award for Outstanding Editorial or Commentary; and, was selected by the Baltimore Business Journal to receive the Leaders in Diversity Award. She also received The Amistad Award for her contributions to human rights and social justice from the Amistad Committee 

In 2020, Whitehead was selected by the Daily Record as one of Maryland's Top 100 Women; by the Baltimore Sun as the Best Radio Host. In 2019, Whitehead received the Collegium Visionary Award from the College of Holy Cross; the Exceptional Merit in Media Award (EMMA) from the National Women's Political Caucus for her work editing and compiling #BlackGirlActivism: Exploring the Ways We Come Though the Storm, a special issue of the Meridians: feminism, race, transnationalism journal (Duke University Press); the Baltimore Sun named her as one of Baltimore's 25 "Women to Watch in 2019”; and, Essence magazine included her on the 2019 “Woke 100 List,” of “black women advocating for change."

Today With Dr. Kaye

In 2020, the radio show received Chesapeake Associated Press Award for Outstanding Editorial or Commentary and in 2019, it received the Cheapeake Associated Press Award for Outstanding Talk Show and the second place Award for Outstanding Editorial or Commentary. Whitehead is also an Opinion Editorial columnist for the Baltimore Afro-American.

Biography
Whitehead received her B.A. from Lincoln University; her M.A. in International Peace Studies from the University of Notre Dame; her graduate degree in Advanced Documentary and Narrative Filmmaking from the New York Film Academy; and her Ph.D. in Language, Literacy, and Culture from the University of Maryland, Baltimore County. She is a member of Delta Sigma Theta sorority.

Whitehead was a middle school teacher in Baltimore City. She was also a documentary filmmaker with Metro TV, a PBS-affiliate and a senior producer for Music Television Networks (MTV). In 2001, she directed and produced The Twin Towers: A History which was nominated for a New York Emmy Award, her third nomination.

Whitehead serves as the National Secretary for the Association for the Study of African American Life and History (ASALH) and the National Secretary for the National Women's Studies Association (NWSA).

Whitehead is the president of the National Women's Studies Association (NWSA), 2020–2023.

Awards
In 2021, Whitehead was named a "Leader in Diversity" by Baltimore Business Journal. In 2016, Whitehead received the Kroc Institute for International Peace Studies’ “Distinguished Alumni” Award from the University of Notre Dame. In 2014, she received the Lifetime Achievement Award from the Progressive National Baptist Convention. In 2013, she received the Faculty Award for Excellence in Engaged Scholarship from Loyola University Maryland.

Writing
Whitehead is a curriculum writer who created and compiled the crowd-sourced Trump Syllabus K12 curriculum: Lesson Plans for Teaching During this New Age of Resistance.

Whitehead is the author of four books including Letters for My Black Sons: Raising Boys in a Post-Racial America and Notes from a Colored Girl: The Civil War Pocket Diaries of Emilie Frances Davis which was reviewed in Journal of American History. A documentary film The Women of Philadelphia  was made about the book  and it received both the 2015 Darlene Clark Hine Award from the Organization of American Historians and the 2014 Letitia Woods Brown Book Award from the Association of Black Women Historians.

External links
 Keynote, ASALH 90th Annual Black History Month Lunch, https://www.c-span.org/video/?405063-1/90th-annual-black-history-luncheon
 University of Notre Dame's 2016 Distinguished Alumni Award Presentation featuring Karsonya Wise Whitehead,https://www.youtube.com/watch?v=_lMQ7We4tHc
 UMBC Grit-X Talk, "From MeSearch to ReSearch: Finding Ways to Add Your Voice to the Wind of Social Media, https://www.youtube.com/watch?v=5iyc0PTVpDU
 Notes From A Colored Girl: The Civil War Pocket Diaries of Emilie Frances Davis, https://www.youtube.com/watch?v=W6r5vHv0I-Y
 Talk, Brown University's Writing Diversity lecture series, https://www.youtube.com/watch?v=hcIm9gy4hFY
 Keynote, "From the Civil War to Ferguson: Role of the Black Church as a Training Ground for Activism," College of the Holy Cross, https://www.youtube.com/watch?v=fyYk4KQPUHI
 Interview with New York Film Academy graduate Karsonya Wise Whitehead, https://www.youtube.com/watch?v=G-TpIUbWP1k
 Interview with Dr. Lawrence Brown for The Real News, "From Slavery to Freedom: The Work and Message of Dr. Karsonya Wise Whitehead," https://www.youtube.com/watch?v=cuKC7gu4ZxE
 MAMEC | 3-23-2014 Women's History Month | Karsonya (Kaye) Wise Whitehead,https://www.youtube.com/watch?v=t5qasFXhBlM
 On Emily Davis, https://www.youtube.com/watch?v=VUS4OWoJr30&feature=emb_logo
 Philadelphia: The Great Experiment, Kaye Whitehead on Emilie Davis, https://www.youtube.com/watch?v=F-6jVnVQ1Kc&feature=emb_logo
 Philadelphia: The Great Experiment, Kaye Whitehead on Emilie Davis' Journal, https://www.youtube.com/watch?v=ZE2txjLvbq4&feature=emb_logo
 Philadelphia: The Great Experiment, Kaye Whitehead on Frederick Douglass, https://www.youtube.com/watch?v=aoH0vw0lHOc
 https://www.youtube.com/watch?v=GbvU0ZDbr4M&feature=emb_logo

References

Year of birth missing (living people)
Living people
21st-century African-American people
21st-century African-American women
African-American academics
African-American women academics
American educators
American filmmakers
American women academics
American women radio journalists
Loyola University Maryland faculty
Lincoln University (Pennsylvania) alumni
New York Film Academy alumni
University of Maryland, Baltimore County alumni
University of Notre Dame alumni